Matt Ellis (born August 31, 1981) is a Canadian former professional ice hockey left winger and current assistant coach for the Buffalo Sabres of the National Hockey League. Not selected in an NHL Entry Draft, Ellis has also played in the NHL for the Detroit Red Wings, Los Angeles Kings and the Sabres.

Playing career

Amateur
Ellis began his major junior hockey career in the Ontario Hockey League (OHL) with the Toronto St. Michael's Majors in 1998. Each subsequent season with the Majors saw Ellis improve his point totals, from 18 the first year, onto 35, 45, and finishing with 38 goals and 51 assists for 89 total points in his final year with Toronto, helping them with the Central Division title.

Professional
As a result of his OHL performances, the Detroit Red Wings signed the undrafted Ellis as a free agent on May 10, 2002. He was then sent to play on the Red Wings' ECHL affiliate, the Toledo Storm, where he posted 59 points in the regular season and tacked on eight points in the Storm's short playoff run.

In the following season, 2003–04, Ellis was called up to the American Hockey League (AHL) to join the Red Wings' top-level affiliate, the Grand Rapids Griffins; he recorded his first AHL point on October 24, 2003, with an assist on the game-winning goal against the Utah Grizzlies. Ellis again took time to adjust to the faster pace of the AHL, but soon found his place with the team. Each season saw his point totals increasing, and in 2005–06, he was named team captain, the youngest-ever in Griffins' history. On earning the captaincy and his confidence level, Ellis stated:

 "It's definitely a big factor. You can totally tell the difference when there's a guy out there playing with confidence and when a guy's unsure of himself. Being a fourth-year pro, it makes a huge difference. Each year, you come in with a little more confidence, and I’ve been fortunate enough to be surrounded by some great players and coaches who were there to give me a pat on the back or help me out and keep me motivated." 

When asked about the chance to play for the Red Wings, Ellis then said:

"I’m hoping. Grand Rapids is a great place to learn and develop, but I’d like to get my feet wet in Detroit – for sure." 

Ellis made his NHL debut for the Red Wings on December 18, 2006, in a 4–3 loss to the Columbus Blue Jackets.

Nearly two years later, on February 21, 2008, Ellis was claimed off of waivers by the Los Angeles Kings. He scored his first goal with the Kings, an empty-netter, on March 13, against the Nashville Predators at Sommet Center in Nashville, Tennessee.

Shortly before the commencement of the 2008–09 season, on October 1, 2008, Ellis was claimed off of waivers from the Kings by the Buffalo Sabres. He played his first game with the latter on October 15 against the New York Rangers. On December 18, after injuries to several Buffalo forwards, Ellis was recalled from Buffalo's then-AHL affiliate, the Portland Pirates, for the second time that season. In the subsequent off-season, on July 9, 2009, he resigned with the Sabres on a one-year contract.

On August 31, 2010, Ellis was re-signed to an additional one-year contract with Buffalo. To begin the following 2010–11 season, the Sabres placed Ellis on waivers, which he cleared on October 4, 2010. On July 19, 2011, in the off-season, Ellis signed a multi-year contract extension with the Sabres.

During the lockout-shortened 2012–13 season, Ellis was again waived and was sent to the AHL's Rochester Americans after six games played with Buffalo. After 12 points in 35 games with the Americans, Ellis opted to remain with the Sabres organization, signing a two-year, two-way contract extension on July 3, 2013.

In the 2014–15 season, Ellis was recalled to the Sabres during the midpoint of the season, and on April 1, 2015, he scored his first goal of the campaign in a Buffalo victory over the Toronto Maple Leafs.

On July 9, 2015, Ellis signed a one-year contract with the Rochester Americans. Ellis announced his retirement at the end of the season. He immediately joined The Academy of Hockey, which like the Sabres and Americans is owned by Terrence Pegula, as a coach.

Career statistics

Awards and achievements
2004–05: Matched a Grand Rapids Griffins record with four short-handed goals, giving him the nickname "shorty";
2004–05: First player in Griffins history to score two shorthanded goals in a home game. (March 12, 2005 vs. Hamilton Bulldogs);
2005–06: Named youngest captain in Grand Rapids Griffins' history.

References

External links

1981 births
Living people
Buffalo Sabres players
Canadian ice hockey left wingers
Detroit Red Wings players
Grand Rapids Griffins players
Sportspeople from Welland
Los Angeles Kings players
Portland Pirates players
Rochester Americans players
Toledo Storm players
Toronto St. Michael's Majors players
Undrafted National Hockey League players
Ice hockey people from Ontario